Bae Su-ji (born October 10, 1994), better known as Bae Suzy, is a South Korean singer, actress and model. She was a member of the girl group Miss A under JYP Entertainment. She made her debut as an actress with television series Dream High (2011) and has gone on to appear in series such as Gu Family Book (2013), Uncontrollably Fond (2016), While You Were Sleeping (2017), Vagabond (2019), Start-Up (2020), and Anna (2022). She made her film debut in Architecture 101 (2012). Since her successful film debut, she has been hailed as "The Nation's First Love" in her home country.

Early life
Bae was born in Buk District, Gwangju, South Korea on October 10, 1994, to Bae Wan-young and Jeong Hyun-sook. She has an older sister and a younger brother. She attended School of Performing Arts Seoul and graduated in 2013. Before debuting, she was an online shopping model.

Career

2009–2010: Debut with Miss A 

In 2009, Bae auditioned for Mnet Superstar K and made it through the preliminary round but she was ultimately eliminated. However, she caught the attention of a scout from JYP Entertainment and soon became a trainee.

In March 2010, Bae became a member of the formed group Miss A.

2010–2016: Rising popularity 

In October 2010, Bae became the fixed host for MBC Show! Music Core alongside Minho and Onew, both members of Shinee, and Jiyeon, of T-ara. Bae later hosted other events such as the Seoul Music Awards, Golden Disc Awards, and Mnet 20's Choice Awards where she won an award under the category "Hot New Star of 2011".

Apart from her group activities, Bae also ventured into acting. She made her acting debut in the music teen drama Dream High, which aired on KBS from January 3 to February 28. She also released an OST for the drama, titled "Winter Child". The drama was a local success, earning high viewership ratings during its two-month run; and also gained popularity in other countries. At the KBS Drama Awards, Bae won the Best New Actress award as well as Best Couple award with co-star Kim Soo-hyun. Bae also became a cast member in KBS TV reality show Invincible Youth 2. The show began filming its first episode on October 19 and aired on November 11.

Bae made her film debut with Architecture 101 (2012) playing the younger version of the female protagonist. Architecture 101 was one of the ten most-watched films in Korea in the first quarter of 2012, and achieved over 4.1 million admissions nine weeks after its theater release; a new box-office record set for Korean melodramas. The same year, Bae played a supporting role in KBS drama Big, written by the Hong sisters, alongside Gong Yoo and Lee Min-jung.

Bae was the first Korean female celebrity to win a singer rookie award, drama rookie award, film rookie award, and variety rookie award. She received the Best New Actress award at the 48th Baeksang Arts Awards for her acting performance in Architecture 101. On December 22, 2012, Bae won the Best Newcomer award in the Variety category at the KBS Entertainment Awards for her stint in Invincible Youth 2

In 2013, she starred in the historical fusion drama Gu Family Book alongside Lee Seung-gi. She received acting recognition at the MBC Drama Awards, winning the Top Excellence award and at the Seoul International Drama Awards, winning the Outstanding Actress award. She also featured on the variety show Healing Camp, becoming the youngest guest on the show.

In May 2014, Bae was cast in the film The Sound of a Flower (2015) as Jin Chae-seon, Korea's first female pansori singer. The film depicts the struggle of a singer who is not allowed to perform in the public because of her gender during the Joseon era. To prepare herself for the role, Bae received training in pansori for a year. The same year, she collaborated with Taiwanese singer-actor Show Lo in the single "Together In Love", featured in his album Reality Show.

In January 2016, Bae released a digital single titled "Dream" in collaboration with Exo's Baekhyun. The song debuted at number one on Gaon's weekly digital chart and proceeded to win the "Best Collaboration" award at the Mnet Asian Music Awards. She then starred in the romance melodrama Uncontrollably Fond with Kim Woo-bin. Bae released two OSTs for the drama, including a self-composed song. In September 2016, Bae's wax figure at Madame Tussauds Hong Kong went on display. She is the first Korean female celebrity to receive a wax-likeness of herself at Madame Tussauds.

2017–present: Solo debut and new agency
In early 2017, Bae made her debut as a solo artist with the album titled Yes? No?. Her pre-release single "Pretend" was released on January 17 and achieved an all-kill on music charts. The title track, "Yes, No, Maybe" was released a week after, on January 24, 2017. In February 2017, Bae released a duet with singer Park Won, titled "Don't Wait for Your Love".
She then returned to television, starring alongside Lee Jong-suk in the fantasy thriller drama While You Were Sleeping, which premiered in September 2017.
On December 27, following the announcement of Min's departure, JYP Entertainment announced that Miss A had disbanded. Bae renewed her contract with JYP Entertainment.

On January 22, 2018, Bae released her pre-release track entitled "In Love with Someone Else", which achieved a real-time all kill. 
Her second album, titled Faces of Love, was released on January 29, with the lead single "Holiday". On February 14, the music video for her b-side track, "Sober", was released. On March 9, Bae released her fourth music video for the single "Midnight", featuring a piano ensemble by Yiruma.

On March 31, 2019, Bae left JYP Entertainment following the expiration of her contract. She then signed a contract with acting agency Management SOOP. She then starred in the spy-action drama Vagabond, playing a secret agent; and action film Ashfall, playing the role of Ha Jung-woo's wife.

In 2020, Bae starred in the drama Start Up as an aspiring entrepreneur who dreams of becoming Korea's Steve Jobs by creating a start-up.

On February 17, 2022, she made her comeback as a singer after 4 years with a single titled "Satellite". Three months later, she joined musician Kang Seung-won's 2nd album project, singing the fifth track "Because I Love You", a ballad about shy love feelings. The same year, she stars in the Coupang Play's series Anna, playing the title role of Lee Anna/Lee Yu-mi, a woman who lives a completely different life under a new identity starting with a small lie she made up. Audiences greatly praised Bae for her acting skills and expression of the character Anna's emotions in the six-episode series (reduced from the original eight-episode count). On October 6, Bae released the digital single "Cape" and its music video.

Public image and impact

Bae became one of the most in-demand endorsers in South Korea, and has been hailed as a "CF Queen" due to numerous endorsement deals ranging from cosmetics, apparel, up to basic commodities like sugar. She made more than 10 billion won in 2013 with more than 14 endorsement deals in one year. In 2020, Bae was nicknamed "Human Dior" as fans noticed her always wearing and promoting the brand. In 2021, South China Morning Post listed her estimated net worth as US$25 million. In April 2022, she has been announced as House ambassador for French luxury fashion house Dior after attending the Dior Fall 2022 show at South Korea's Ewha Womans University. In May 2022, she was the first South Korean female artist to become Ambassador of Elegance for Swiss luxury watch brand Longines.

Idols who have cited Bae as an influence or role model include WJSN's Bona, Oh My Girl's Arin, Jung Chae-yeon, Secret Number's Soodam, Berry Good's Johyun, GFriend's Yerin, Momoland's Nayun, and Melody Day's Yoomin.

Philanthropy 
In April 2014, Bae donated  million to the victims of the Sewol ferry sinking, to be used for the relief work of the Sewol ferry missing and survivors and for the families of the victims. The same year, she registered herself for the organ and tissue donation. In April 2015, Bae joined the Social Welfare Community Chest as the 791st member of the Honor Society, a group of major donors with more than 100 million won.

In June 2016, Bae donated  to the low-income families in her hometown in Gwangju. In March 2017, she donated  million to the Life Sharing Practice Headquarters to be used for patient treatment expenses. On October 10, 2018, on the occasion of her birthday, Bae donated  to the Life Sharing Practice Headquarters to be used for the treatment of children with cancer and leukemia.

In April 2019, Bae donated  million to the Hope Bridge National Disaster Relief Association to help the victims of the large-scale wildfires in Gangwon-do. On her birthday on October 10, 2019, she made a  donation for children with incurable diseases.

In February 2020, Bae donated  million to Good Neighbors (International Humanitarian Development NGO) to prevent the spread of COVID-19 and support the low-income class. In August, she donated  million to the flood victims who were affected by torrential rain, through Hope Bridge National Disaster Relief Association. In September, she donated  million to the 'Dreams of Eunbyul' campaign to support the dreams of children from low-income families and marginalized groups. In October 2020, Bae made a donation of  million through Life Sharing Practice Headquarters to support patients with incurable diseases and pediatric cancer.

In May 2021, Bae donated  million to Happiness Sharing Association ahead of Children's Day and her donation was used to support children at orphanages and support the livelihoods of children who have ended protection. In July 2021, she donated  million through Life Sharing Practice Headquarters to support heart surgeries of premature infants.

In March 2022, Bae made a donation of  million to the Hope Bridge Disaster Relief Association to help the victims of the massive wildfire that started in Uljin, Gyeongbuk and has spread to Samcheok, Gangwon. In August, Bae donated  to help those affected by the 2022 South Korean floods through the Hope Bridge Korea Disaster Relief Association.

In February 2023, Bae donated  million to help in the 2023 Turkey–Syria earthquake through UNICEF of Korea.

Discography

Extended plays
 Yes? No? (2017)
 Faces of Love (2018)

Filmography

Awards and nominations

References

External links 

 Bae Suzy at Management SOOP 

1994 births
Living people
Miss A members
21st-century South Korean actresses
JYP Entertainment artists
K-pop singers
Mandarin-language singers of South Korea
Melon Music Award winners
MAMA Award winners
People from Gwangju
School of Performing Arts Seoul alumni
South Korean female idols
South Korean women pop singers
South Korean film actresses
South Korean television actresses
South Korean television personalities
South Korean child singers
Best New Actress Paeksang Arts Award (film) winners